Eupithecia boryata is a moth in the  family Geometridae. The moth is found on the Canary Islands.

The wingspan is about 14–15 mm.

The larvae probably feed on Quercus species.

References

Moths described in 1906
boryata
Moths of Africa